Brünzow is a municipality in the Vorpommern-Greifswald district, in Mecklenburg-Vorpommern, Germany.

It consists of
Brünzow,
Klein Ernsthof,
Kräpelin,
Stilow,
Stilow-Siedlung,
Vierow.

References

Vorpommern-Greifswald